Mark Birkinshaw is a British physicist, who currently holds the William P. Coldrick chair in Cosmology and Astrophysics at the University of Bristol. He was the first to detect the Sunyaev–Zel'dovich effect.

References

External links
 http://www.phy.bris.ac.uk/people/birkinshaw_m/index.html

Living people
British physicists
Year of birth missing (living people)